The Peter Burge Oval is a cricket ground in Brisbane, Australia. It was named after the Australian cricketer Peter Burge. The first recorded match on the ground was in the 1999/00 season. It was used as a venue to host One Day International matches between Australia and Pakistan in the 2014–16 ICC Women's Championship.

See also
 List of cricket grounds in Australia
 List of women's One Day International cricket grounds

References

External links
Peter Burge Oval at CricketArchive

Cricket grounds in Queensland
Sports venues in Brisbane
1999 establishments in Australia